Lanna is a bimunicipal locality situated in Lekeberg Municipality and Örebro Municipality in Örebro County, Sweden with 537 inhabitants in 2010.

References 

Örebro
Populated places in Örebro Municipality
Populated places in Lekeberg Municipality